Cosmiophrys chrysobola is a species of moth of the family Tortricidae. It is found in Madagascar.

References

Archipini
Moths described in 1970
Moths of Madagascar
Taxa named by Alexey Diakonoff